John Francis "Red" Waller (June 16, 1883 – February 9, 1915) was a Major League Baseball pitcher who played for one season. He pitched for the New York Giants for one game on April 27 during the 1909 New York Giants season. He pitched one inning, allowing two runs, neither of them earned.

External links

1883 births
1915 deaths
Major League Baseball pitchers
Baseball players from Washington, D.C.
New York Giants (NL) players
Waterbury Rough Riders players
Bridgeport Orators players
Jersey City Skeeters players
Lynn Leonardites players